Maria Isabel Pagunsan Lopez—Melrod (born 14 September 1962), is a Filipina movie and television actress.

Lopez was the Binibining Pilipinas Universe 1982 titleholder and represented the Philippines in the 31st Miss Universe Pageant in Lima, Peru. She became controversially known as a Filipina beauty queen and an actress provocatively known for acting Sex in film. Lopez was previously married to a Japanese national, Hiroshi Yokohama, later annulled. Lopez then married Jonathan Melrod in the United States. She is a mosaic artist and a professional member of the Society of American Mosaic Artists and acts in various roles in Philippine cinema.

Pageantry
Lopez is from Cagayan de Oro and was born to Benjamin Lopez and Crescencia Pagunsan.  Prior to becoming a beauty queen titleholder, she worked as a fashion designer at The SM Store and Rustan's department store as well as a sexy model for various fashion salons, namely by gay fashion designer, Rodolfo Fuentes (1950—2011) who scouted her as a candidate in the national pageant that year and was assigned as candidate number # 15.

At age 24, she won the Binibining Pilipinas Universe beauty pageant in 1982, after being almost dethroned for her pre-discovery as a sexy lingerie model in a Girard Peter fashion show due to an immorality clause set by Stella Araneta. Lopez maintains that she was pressured to resign her title but refused.  Lopez further gained notoriety when the famed mistaken question of virginity from Philippine judge and actress Rita Gomez (1935—1990) was attributed during her national competition (in actuality was for Janet Sales of Manila), creating an urban legend among beauty pageant connoisseurs during the 1980s. During her national competition, she was asked by American drummer Alphonse Mouzon regarding the independence of women. At her coronation night, her name was initially  mispronounced as Maricar Isabel Lopez, later corrected.

Film work
Lopez became controversial when she entered the movies due to her highly sexualized roles not usually expected of a beauty queen titleholder. Her first movie Sana, Bukas Pa Ang Kahapon (English: “Hoping, that tomorrow is still what passed”) in 1983, starred Hilda Koronel, Lorna Tolentino, Dindo Fernando and Jay Ilagan, and was directed by Romy Suzara. She was in the original cast of Working Girls (1984), a comedy film where she starred as a young office worker who  entered as a sex worker at night to gain more income, directed by National Artist Ishmael Bernal. In 1988, Lopez was hired as a commercial sexy model for White Castle Whiskey.

During the height of her popularity, Lopez began more intense sexual and romanticized movies, namely the following:

 Silip: Daughters of Eve — by Elwood Perez (1985)
 Isla (English: “Island”) (1985) — by Celso Ad Castillo
 Hubo Sa Dilim — (English: “Naked in the Darkness”) (1985) 
 Mga Nakaw Na Sandali — (English: “Stolen Moments”) (1986) 
  Dingding Lang ang Pagitan — (English: “Only thin walls that separate”) (1986) among other sexualized films.

She won the Golden Screen Award Best Supporting Actress Award for Kinatay (English: “Butchered”) (2009). Lopez walked the red carpet at the Cannes International Film Festival in France for Brilliante Mendoza's award-winning film, Kinatay (2009).Lopez again walked the red carpet at the Cannes International Film Festival in France for Brilliante Mendoza's award-winning film, Ma'Rosa (2016).

Lopez was the line producer for Tulak (2009), and HIV: Si Heidi, Si Ivy at Si V (2010). She was also in the cast again for the modern sequel, Working Girls (2010 film) for GMA Films under the helm of Jose Javier Reyes. Lopez was one of the castaways in  GMA Network's Survivor Philippines: Celebrity Doubles Showdown (2011-2012), in tandem with her daughter, Mara Lopez, also an actress in her own right having won Cinema One Originals Best Actress 2012. She played the mother of Sid Lucero in GMA-7's prime time series, Legacy (2012).

List of controversies
In 2009, Lopez became the center of controversy when she was not given a complimentary ticket for the Binibining Pilipinas 2009 pageant, an oversight she strongly resented in public due to not being allowed to sit in the box where former beauty titleholders were allotted after finally obtaining a ticket.

In 2010, Lopez became involved in a conflict   with various Philippine journalists, namely Ricky Lo who implied that Lopez strongly desired the passing of Stella Araneta. Lopez vehemently denied the allegation as libel, but maintained the accusation that Araneta is an elitist, who refuses to address people of impoverished backgrounds due to her grandiose ego. Lopez maintains that Araneta has never forgiven her for making sexualized films after her reign as Miss Philippines 1982.

In 2016, Lopez gained notoriety for a green pageant gown she wore for the 2015 Cannes Film Festival wherein she made comparative comments of her evening gown to the one used by Pia Wurtzbach.

In January 2017, Lopez  publicly revealed on a televised Philippine morning show Unang Hirit, the strong discrimination against dark contestants during her time as a beauty queen titleholder. She noted that during the Miss Universe 1982 visit  at the Presidential Palace in Peru, the first lady Pilar Nores de García was racially dismissive towards dark-skinned contestants, namely Miss Papua New Guinea and Turks and Caicos.

In November 2017, Lopez was penalized for illegally driving, removing traffic cones among others, on the driving lane  reserved for the ASEAN delegates which were being hosted in the Philippines. Consequentially, Lopez' driver's license was revoked and confiscated along with a minimal fine after complaints from the Metropolitan Manila Development Authority employees upon discovery of sharing the violation on her Facebook account. The Metropolitan Manila Development Authority  recommended the violation to the Land Transportation Office to suspend or cancel her driver's license.  Lopez later claimed that seeing other vehicles using the ASEAN lane prompted her to drive on it as well. The office later revoked her license and barred her from reapplying and reacquiring her license for the next two years.  She was also fined ₱8,000 (US$160) for ignoring traffic signs, reckless driving and violating the Anti-Distracted Driving Act. Lopez accepted the charges and issued a public apology.

Personal life
Lopez married Japanese national Hiroshi Yokohama, a former DHL executive in 1990 and both lived in Tokyo, Japan. The couple later moved to the Philippines and separated in 2006 due to claims of abuse and infidelity. They have two children, a daughter, Mara Lopez, an actress, and son, Kenyo "Ken" Yokohama, a Civil Engineering graduate of De La Salle University. On 9 June 2019, Lopez married a Jewish American National, Jonathan D. Melrod, and both live in Sebastopol, California.

Lopez studied Fine Arts at the University of the Philippines Diliman and is member of the NCCA (National Commission for Culture and Arts), and was Secretary of the Committee on Visual Arts for the year 2011— 2013. Lopez also completed art classes both in Chicago Mosaic School and Institute of Mosaic Art in Berkeley, California. In 2015, she toured UNESCO Italian mosaics in Ravenna, Italy as part of her interest in mosaics at  www.mariaisabellopezart.com.

Selected filmography

Television

Movies 

{| class="wikitable" style="font-size: 95%;"
! Year !! Title !! Role !! Film Company
|-
| 1989 || Sa Kuko Ng Agila || Shirley ||  
|-
| 1988 || Red Roses For a Call Girl || ||  
|-
| 1987 || When Good Girls Go Wrong || ||  
|-
| rowspan="8"|1986 ||  Bakit Naglaho ang Magdamag || ||  
|-
| Kapirasong Dangal || ||  
|-
| Dingding ang Pagitan || ||  
|-
| Mga Nakaw na Sandali || ||  
|-
| Huwag Pamarisan: Kulasisi || || rowspan="3"| 
|-
| Unang Gabi || 
|-
| Hayok || 
|-
| Silip || Tonya ||  
|-
| rowspan="4"|1985 || Hubo sa Dilim || ||  
|-
| Heartache City || Joji ||  
|-
| Hello Lover, Goodbye Friend || ||  
|-
| Escort Girls || ||  
|-
| rowspan="3"|1984 || Isla || Isla || rowspan="2"| 
|-
| Working Girls || 
|-
| Batuigas II: Pasukuin si Waway ||  ||  
|-
| rowspan="2"|1983 || Dugong Buhay ||  || rowspan="2"| 
|-
| Sana, Bukas Pa ang Kahapon || Candy 
|}Siphayo (2016)Barcelona: A Love Untold (2016)Just the 3 of Us (2016)Maria Leonora Teresa (2014)Mariposa: Sa Hawla ng Gabi (2012)Ang Misis ni Meyor (2012)Corazon: Ang Unang Aswang (2012)Captive (2012)Ritwal: The Faithfools (2011)Sirip (2011)Cuchera (2011)HIV: Si Heidi, Si IVY At Si V (2010)Ika-Sampu (2010)Ang Babae Sa Sementeryo (2010)Ways of the Sea (2010)Working Girls (2010)Pilantik (2010)FidelKinatay (2009)Hilot (2009)Tulak (2009)Ay Ayeng'' (2008)

See also
Binibining Pilipinas
Miss Universe 1982
Philippines at major beauty pageants

References

External links

"Former Bb. Pilipinas-Universe Maria Isabel Lopez attacks BPCI head"
"Maria Isabel Lopez admits past relationships with politicians and lesbians"
"Maria Isabel Lopez's career blooms anew after Survivor Philippines: Celebrity Doubles Showdown"

Living people
People from Cagayan de Oro
Actresses from Misamis Oriental
Binibining Pilipinas winners
Participants in Philippine reality television series
Survivor Philippines contestants
Miss Universe 1982 contestants
University of the Philippines Diliman alumni
1958 births
GMA Network personalities
ABS-CBN personalities